Mueang Ranong is the capital district (amphoe mueang) of Ranong province, southern Thailand.

Geography
Neighboring districts are (from the north clockwise) La-un of Ranong Province, Phato of Chumphon province, and Kapoe of Ranong. To the west across the Kraburi River estuary is the Tanintharyi Division of Myanmar.

Administration
The district is divided into nine sub-districts (tambons), which are further subdivided into 39 villages (muban). The town (thesaban mueang) Ranong covers tambon Khao Niwet. There are three sub-district municipalities (thesaban tambon): Ngao and Pak Nam each cover parts of the same-named tambons, while Bang Rin covers the whole tambon. There are a further seven tambon administrative organization (TAO).

External links
amphoe.com (Thai)

Ranong
Districts of Ranong province